is a Japanese director known for his work in animated television series and films.

Career
Ōsumi was born in Hyōgo Prefecture, Japan, and graduated from School of Media Science at the Tokyo University of Technology. He got his start in the entertainment industry as the leader of a puppet theater in Kobe. This led to an association with Tokyo Movie Shinsha, one of the first Japanese animation studios.

In 1969, Ōsumi collaborated with animator Yasuo Ōtsuka in the Moomin TV series, which was an immediate hit. But Finnish author Tove Jansson, creator of the Moomin books, objected strongly to the depiction of the characters in the series. According to Jansson, "My Moomin is No car, No fight, and No money." The series was shifted to another studio after 26 episodes.

Also in 1971, he collaborated with Ōtsuka on Lupin the Third Part I TV series. This series opened to poor ratings and was cancelled after only 23 episodes. Ōsumi directed the first seven episodes and episodes nine and twelve, with the remaining episodes being directed jointly by Hayao Miyazaki and Isao Takahata. Ōsumi was fired by the studio for refusing to adapt the sophisticated series for a children's audience. He went on to direct film and television animations for a number of other studios, and for the national broadcaster NHK. In 1993, he returned to direct one more Lupin episode, entitled Orders to Assassinate Lupin.

Filmography
 Obake no Qtarō (TV, movie), 1965–67
 Kaibutsu kun (TV), 1968–69
 Moomin (TV), 1969
 Attack No. 1 (movie), 1969–71
 Lupin the Third: Pilot Film (movie), 1969
 Lupin the Third Part I (TV), 1971
 La Seine no Hoshi (TV), 1975
 Robokko Bīton (TV), 1976–77
 The Yearling (TV), 1983
 Hashire Merosu (movie), 1992
 Orders to Assassinate Lupin, 1993

References

External links

1934 births
Anime directors
Japanese animated film directors
Japanese animators
Japanese television directors
Living people
Lupin the Third
People from Hyōgo Prefecture